The 2004 Coppa Italia Final was the final of the 2003–04 Coppa Italia, the 57th season of the top cup competition in Italian football. The match was played over two legs between Lazio and Juventus. This was the 13th Coppa Italia final appearance by Juventus and the 5th by Lazio. It was the first meeting of these two clubs in the finals. The first leg was played in Rome on 17 March 2004, in which Lazio won 2–0. The second leg was played on 12 May 2004 in Turin and the two clubs drew 2–2, giving Lazio their 4th title on an aggregate result of 4–2.

First leg

Second leg

References

Coppa Italia Finals
Coppa Italia Final 2004
Coppa Italia Final 2004
Coppa Italia